Sultan Haji Ahmad Shah Al-Musta’in Billah ibni Almarhum Sultan Abu Bakar Ri’ayatuddin Al-Mu’azzam Shah (24 October 1930 – 22 May 2019) was the fifth modern Sultan of Pahang, and also served as the seventh Yang di-Pertuan Agong of Malaysia from 26 April 1979 to 25 April 1984. His abdication as Sultan was decided by the Royal Council at an extraordinary meeting on 11 January 2019. A special amendment was passed on the state constitution that gave the body more power for this decision, citing the Sultan's incapability to rule due to his failing health. The abdication announced the next day which was retroactively effective on the day of the Royal Council meeting, paving the way to his son, Abdullah to succeed him as Sultan immediately, and subsequently be elected as the next Yang di-Pertuan Agong later the same month.

Biography

Born on at 12:00 pm. Friday 24 October 1930 at Istana Mangga Tunggal, Pekan, Pahang. he was the only son of Sultan Abu Bakar Ri’ayatuddin Al-Mu’azzam Shah ibni Almarhum Sultan Abdullah Al-Mu’tassim Billah Shah (reigned 1932–died 1974) by his official and royal consort, Tengku Ampuan Besar Raja Fatimah binti Almarhum Sultan Iskandar Shah Kaddasullah (1910–1988), a princess of Perak royal family.

A student of the Malay College Kuala Kangsar, he received diplomas in public administration from Worcester College, Oxford and the University of Exeter.  He succeeded his father as sultan in 1974.

His election as the 7th Yang di-Pertuan Agong in 1979 was marked with controversy as he was said to be at odds with the incoming prime minister Dr. Mahathir Mohamad.  However, the rumours proved to be untrue and he proved to be a keen admirer of the prime minister.  Twenty-two years earlier, his father Abu Bakar had failed five times to be elected as the first Agong.

A controversial, headstrong personality, he has often forced his chief ministers in Pahang to resign over minor differences.

His favourite hobby was playing football, golf, polo, and equestrian activities.

Sultan Ahmad Shah is a keen sportsman and was the President of the Malaysian Football Association (FAM) from 1984 until 2014, the President of Asian Football Confederation (AFC) until 2002 and Asean Football Federation (AFF) 2011 until 2019.

His official and royal consort, Tengku Ampuan Afzan binti Tengku Panglima Perang Muhammad, a member of the Terengganu royal family, served as his Raja Permaisuri Agong but died of cancer on her return to Pahang on 29 June 1988.  Sultan Ahmad Shah's second wife Kalsom binti Abdullah (nee Anita), was designated as the Sultanah of Pahang in 1991. They then both had a child, Tengku Arif Temenggong Pahang Tengku Fahd Mua'adzam.

Abdication and death

After being ill for some time, Sultan Ahmad Shah abdicated with effect from 11 January 2019 (when it was the turn of Pahang to provide the Agong) upon the amendment of the state's constitution. On 22 May 2019, Sultan Ahmad Shah died at 8:50 am at the National Heart Institute, Kuala Lumpur at aged 88.   He was laid to rest next to the grave of his late wife, Tengku Ampuan Afzan at the Pahang Royal Mausoleum near Abu Bakar Royal Mosque in Pekan, Pahang. The state of Pahang observed 40 days of mourning, and Pahang flags across the state were flown at half-mast, while all entertainment events for the next 3 days were cancelled.

Issue

Awards and recognitions

Honours

As the Yang di-Pertuan Agong from 1979 to 1984, Sultan Haji Ahmad Shah was automatically designated under constitutional provisions as the Supreme Commander of the Malaysian Armed Forces, holding the rank of the Field Marshal of the Royal Malaysian Air Force, Admiral of the Royal Malaysian Navy and Field Marshal of the Army.

Until he stepped down in 2019 he was the RMAF's Colonel in Chief and appeared at official RMAF ceremonies.

He has been awarded :

Honours of Pahang

   : 
  Founding Grand Master and Member (DKP) of the Royal Family Order of Pahang (since 24 October 1977)
  Grand Master and Member 1st class (DK I) of the Family Order of the Crown of Indra of Pahang (since 1974)
  Founding Grand Master of the Grand Royal Order of Sultan Ahmad Shah of Pahang (SDSA, since 23 October 2010)
  Founding Grand Master and Grand Knight of the Order of Sultan Ahmad Shah of Pahang (SSAP, since 24 October 1977)
  Knight Companion (DIMP), Grand Knight (SIMP) and Grand Master of the Order of the Crown of Pahang (since 1974)
  Sultan Abu Bakar Silver Jubilee Medal (24 June 1957)

National
  (as Yang di-Pertuan Agong, 29 March 1979 – 25 April 1984) : 
  Recipient of Order of the Royal House of Malaysia (DKM)
  Recipient (DMN) and Grand Master (1979-1984) of the Order of the Crown of the Realm 
  Grand Master (1979-1984) of the Order of the Defender of the Realm
  Grand Master (1979-1984) of the Order of Loyalty to the Crown of Malaysia
  Grand Master (1979-1984) of the Order of Merit of Malaysia
  Grand Master (1979-1984) of the Order of the Royal Household of Malaysia
  :
  Sultan Ismail Coronation Medal (10 February 1960)
  Knight Grand Commander of the Order of the Crown of Johor (SPMJ) - Dato' (1972)
  First Class of the Royal Family Order of Johor (DK I) (1 November 1975)
  Sultan Ibrahim Coronation Medal (23 March 2015)
  : 
  Member of the Royal Family Order of Kedah (DK) 
  :
  Recipient of the Royal Family Order or Star of Yunus (DK)
  : 
  Member of the Royal Family Order of Negeri Sembilan (DKNS)
  : 
  Grand Knight of the Order of Cura Si Manja Kini (SPCM) — Dato' Seri (1970)
 Member of the  Royal Family Order of Perak (DK) (1975)
  : 
  Recipient of the Perlis Family Order of the Gallant Prince Syed Putra Jamalullail (DK)
  : 
  First Class of the Royal Family Order of Selangor (DK I) (1987)
  : 
  Member first class of the Family Order of Terengganu (DK I)

Foreign
  : 
 Grand Cross of the Order of the Liberator General San Martín (26 September 2006)
  : 
 Recipient of Royal Family Order of the Crown of Brunei (DKMB)
 First Class of the Family Order of Laila Utama (DK) - Dato Laila Utama (1980)
  : 
 Collar of the Order of Mubarak the Great
  : 
 Star of the Socialist Republic of Romania 1st class (25 November 1982)
  : 
 Badr Chain (January 1982)
  : 
 Grand Order of Mugunghwa
  : 
 Queen Elizabeth II Coronation Medal (2 June 1953)

Places named after him

Several places were named after him, including:

 Sultan Haji Ahmad Shah Campus (Universiti Tenaga Nasional (UNITEN) branch campus) in Muadzam Shah, Pahang
 Sultan Haji Ahmad Shah Science Secondary School (SEMSAS), a secondary school in Kuantan, Pahang
 Sultan Haji Ahmad Shah Science School Pekan (SHAH Pekan), a secondary school in Pekan, Pahang
 Sultan Haji Ahmad Shah Al-Mustain Billah Vocational College, a vocational college in Kuala Lipis Pahang
 Sultan Ahmad Shah Pahang Islamic University College (KUIPSAS)
 Sultan Ahmad Shah Polytechnic (POLISAS), a polytechnic in Kuantan, Pahang
 Ma'ahad As-Sultan Ahmad Shah Ad-Dini, a secondary school in Bandar Tun Razak, Jengka, Pahang
 Sultan Haji Ahmad Shah Al-Mustain Billah Mosque in Temerloh, Pahang
 Sultan Ahmad Shah State Mosque at Kuantan
 Sultan Ahmad Shah Bridge (Temerloh Bridge) on Federal Route 2 at Temerloh
 Sultan Ahmad Shah II Bridge (Semantan Bridge) on East Coast Expressway at Semantan
 Sultan Ahmad Shah III Bridge (Chenor Bridge) at Chenor
 Jalan Sultan Ahmad Shah (formerly Northam Road) in George Town, Penang
 Jalan Sultan Haji Ahmad Shah, Kuala Lumpur (formerly Jalan Khidmat Usaha)
 Sultan Haji Ahmad Shah Airport, an airport in Kuantan, Pahang
 Sultan Haji Ahmad Shah Hospital (formerly Hospital Temerloh) in Temerloh, Pahang
 Sultan Haji Ahmad Shah Cup (Charity Shield Malaysia)
 Sultan Haji Ahmad Shah Mosque, International Islamic University Malaysia Gombak Campus
 Sultan Haji Ahmad Shah Mosque, International Islamic University Malaysia Kuantan Campus
 Sekolah Sultan Haji Ahmad Shah, a primary school in Pekan, Pahang
 SMK Sultan Ahmad Shah, a secondary school in Cameron Highlands, Pahang
 Taman Pertanian Jubli Perak Sultan Haji Ahmad Shah in Kuantan, Pahang
 Pusat Jagaan Taman Pengasih Sultan Haji Ahmad Shah in Kuantan, Pahang
 Institut Latihan Sultan Ahmad Shah in Kajang, Selangor
 Pusat Kokurikulum Sultan Haji Ahmad Shah, Jabatan Pelajaran Negeri Pahang
 Akademi Maritim Sultan Ahmad Shah (AMSAS) in Kuantan, Pahang

Ancestry

Notes

References

 Coercion and Governance: The Declining Political Role of the Military in Asia, Muthiah Alagappa, Stanford University Press, 2001, 
 Information Malaysia, Published by Berita Publ. Sdn. Bhd., 1989
 The Europa Year Book, Europa Publications Limited, 1984,

External links

 PAHANG, HRH , Sultan Haji Ahmad Shah Al-Mustain Billah ibni Al-Marhum Sultan Abu Bakar Ri’Ayatuddin Al-Muadzam Shah International Who's Who. accessed 1 September 2006.

Monarchs of Malaysia
Ahmad Shah
1930 births
2019 deaths
Ahmad Shah
Ahmad Shah
Marshals of the Royal Malaysian Air Force
Presidents of the Asian Football Confederation
Association football executives
Malaysian people of Malay descent
Malaysian Muslims
Monarchs who abdicated

Recipients of the Darjah Kerabat Diraja Malaysia
First Classes of Royal Family Order of Selangor
First Classes of the Royal Family Order of Johor
Knights Grand Commander of the Order of the Crown of Johor
Members of the Royal Family Order of Kedah
First Classes of the Family Order of Terengganu

Alumni of Worcester College, Oxford
Grand Crosses of the Order of the Liberator General San Martin
20th-century Malaysian politicians
21st-century Malaysian politicians
Recipients of the Order of the Crown of the Realm
Recipients of the Order of Merit of Malaysia